Oleksandr-Zenon Stepanovych Kurbas (24 February 1887– 30 November 1937), was a Ukrainian movie and theater director. He is considered by many to be the most important Ukrainian theater director of the 20th century. He formed, together with Vsevolod Meyerhold, Yevgeny Vakhtangov and several other directors, the Soviet theater avant-garde in the 1920s and 1930s. He is one of the most prominent representatives of Ukrainian avant-garde art. He is considered to be one of the lead figures of the Executed Renaissance.

Early work 
Kurbas was born in Sambir (then part of Austria-Hungary) on February 25, 1887 and was given a double name Oleksandr-Zenon, for short Les or Oles. His father, Stepan Pylypovych Kurbas (Yanovych) (1862–1908), was a Ruthenian actor who descended from Lithuanian lineage. His mother, Vanda Adolfivna (nata Kulczycka), born in Stary Skalat, was also an actress, the daughter of an Austrian, Adolf Teichman. His parents' last name Yanovych was their pseudonym, for which they were better known, particularly in theater of "Ruska besida". Beside Les who was the first child there were three other children Kornylo (d. 2 July 1895), Nestor, and Nadia, however none of them survived past their teenage years.

At first Kurbas studied at Ternopil gymnasium. In 1907 he enrolled into the Philosophy Department of University of Vienna from where he transferred out in 1908, due to his father death enrolling later in Lviv University (1908–1910). This was determined by the need to lead Ukrainian culture out of the provincialism it had fallen into as a result of the century-long occupation by Poland and Russia.

In the midst of the first world war Kurbas formed the "Ternopil theatrical evenings" (1915–1916) and the Molody Teatr (Young Theater) in Kiev in 1916, which was the first ensemble to experiment with both new and ancient acting techniques. Kurbas directed and acted in plays such as Gogol's Revizor and, most importantly and to much acclaim, Sophocles' Oedipus Rex. Due to the shortage in resources and the general political chaos towards the end of the First World War the ensemble was disbanded. Along with it he was a professor at the Kiev Music-Drama Institute in 1916–1919 and later Kharkiv Music-Drama Institute in 1926–1933. In 1920–21 Les Kurbas has found a Kiev Drama Theater "Kiydramte".

Kurbas' next major project was Haydamaks (several stagings from 1920 on), a poem on the eighteenth-century Ukrainian upsurge against Polish occupation by Ukrainian poet laureate Taras Shevchenko. The production was the most important Ukrainian theater production of the twentieth century and went on to be staged even after Kurbas' death (without mention of his name, though). Kurbas integrated all the techniques of the Molody era, most notably in his treatment of the choir.

Berezil Theater 
It was only in 1922 that conditions in the now Soviet-ruled Ukraine were stable enough to allow Kurbas to found the "Berezil'" ("spring" or "new beginning") in Kyiv. In a same year Les Kurbas invited  Vadym Meller to cooperation as a chief artist of the "Berezil'" Theater. Vadym Meller joined "Berezil'" with the experience of both easel artist and scenographer. The expressively unchained drawing, characteristic of V.Meller's early work, will become foundation, the origin in later stage productions done together with Les Kurbas. Since 1922 Les Kurbas also worked for the Odessa Film Studio where he directed such movies as "Shvedskaya spichka" (1922), "Arsenaltsy" (1925), and others. In 1925 Vadim Meller was awarded a gold medal for the scenic design of the "Berezil'" theatre (Exposition Internationale des Modernes, Paris ). "Berezil'" was not merely a theater, but a study and research institution which until today is nearly unequalled in its organisation. Every theater department has its own committees and workshops, and several branches were established in other Ukrainian cities. "Berezil'" attracted not only the best actors of its time: dozens of future Ukrainian actors and directors received their education here, going through a curriculum involving a whole series of acting techniques, rhythmic exercises, voice training and ensemble play. Kurbas aimed at a scientific grounding of every development in "Berezil'", which could sometimes lead to endless discussions in one of the committees. He wrote: “Today the comedy is over. The actor entered the stage, the only one by which the theater will live. Theater—tribune and spectacle, court and school, thought and folly of new man”.

In its early years the theater suffered from a shortage of suitable plays that the productions could be based on. Kurbas was only one of several directors, if the most important one, and an outstanding organizer. His stagings of the time included "Gas" by the German author Georg Kaiser and "Jimmy Higgins" by Upton Sinclair. Kurbas made mostly use of the expressionistic techniques he had developed during the Molody era, but increased further the rhythmic organisation of the entire production.

In 1927 Kurbas met up-and-coming playwright Mykola Kulish in the Ukrainian capital of the time, Kharkiv, where the "Berezil'" had moved in 1926. Kulish's early plays had been staged by other theaters in the rigid Soviet realist manner that would become the standard all over the Soviet Union in the 1930s. The collaboration between Kulish and Kurbas proved to be both fortunate and unfortunate for the ensemble. While productions as The People's Malakhii (1928), Myna Mazailo (1929) and Maklena Grassa (1933) set new standards in ensemble play and dramatic rigor, they also fell foul with the official Soviet propaganda policy.

Yet Kurbas was determined to pursue his course in spite of the increasing threats. In 1930, just before the artificial famine in Ukraine, Kurbas was forced to stage Dyktatura ("Dictatorship"), by Ukrainian playwright Ivan Mykytenko. The propaganda play was an attempt to justify the Soviet policy that ultimately led to the starvation of the Ukrainian peasantry and caused several million deaths (the Holodomor). Kurbas turned the sense of the play around, a technique he named "recoding", and made a satirical and tragic opera out of a what had been a dull realist plot. While the authorities regarded the production as a final opportunity for Kurbas to give up his refractoriness and step back in line, Kurbas followed his own political instincts. By exposing the regime for what it was, he also dealt the death-blow to the theater and himself. Kurbas wrote: “We all know what dictatorship is, but few of us pay attention to it as to a fact of intellectual nature. The obligation of every actor of the play was to make every spectator understand that the rudder of history—is in his own hands.”

The Taras Schevchenko Academic Ukrainian Drama Theatre in Kharkiv is an heir to Berezil's magnificent artistic traditions.

Imprisonment and execution 
In 1933 Kurbas was ousted from "Berezil". He was allowed to go to Moscow, where he probably was the major force behind Solomon Mikhoels' famous staging of King Lear (1934). Later in 1933 he was arrested and put into a labour camp (as were many other cultural figures). Even under these conditions Les Kurbas showed his unshakable love for the theater. As his friend and competitor Vsevolod Meyerhold would do later during his own imprisonment, Kurbas organized a camp theater and was even in touch with the author of one of the plays he staged to discuss dramaturgical decisions.

Kurbas was then moved to the remote Solovetsky Islands in the White Sea, and was one of the "lost transport" of prisoners shipped back to the mainland in 1937 from Solovki. It is now known that he was shot on 3 November 1937 with 289 other members of the Ukrainian intelligentsia at the killing field and burial ground of Sandarmokh near Medvezhyegorsk, in Karelia (northwest Russia), a site discovered in 1997 by members of the Memorial Society. 

Joseph Stalin had directly ordered the killing of over one thousand artists and intellectuals held in the Solovki prison camp. Kurbas' friend Mykola Kulish, who had been confined to a cage like an animal and consequently fallen into a state of utter mental derangement, met the same fate.

After Stalin’s death, Kurbas was rehabilitated in 1957.

Posterity 

The "Berezil'" Theater lived on under the name of "Shevchenko Theater". One of Kurbas' lead actors, Marjan Kurshelnytsky, led it until the 1960s, but had to make many artistic compromises. Kurbas' work could only be mentioned again from the 1960s onwards, yet the overdue research was only begun in late 1980s, mostly in Ukraine. There is a tendency in the Ukrainian research to glorify Kurbas. Some hagiographers claim that Kurbas was a genius (he was indeed multi-talented) who anticipated every development of the later 20th century theater (some of which he did, as for example in the work of Italian director Eugenio Barba's Odin Teatret). Another important falsification is that Kurbas was not a communist. It would be more correct to say that he had an entirely different vision of communism and the potential of a new society for the development of human creativity. His most important goal as an artist was to "make the audience feel more alive".

Theatre award 
The Les Kurbas Prize is a theatre award of Ukraine that is named after the famous director.

References 

 Irena R. Makaryk: Shakespeare in the Undiscovered Bourn: Les Kurbas, Ukrainian Modernism, and Early Soviet Cultural Politics, University of Toronto Press, 2004. 
 The Last Address: Shooting executions of Solovki prisoners of Ukrainian origin in 1937–1938, Kyiv, Sfera, 2003.  (Volume 1)  
 Mayhill C. Fowler, Beau Monde on Empire’s Edge: State and Stage in Soviet Ukraine FowlerMayhill C., Beau Monde on Empire’s Edge: State and Stage in Soviet Ukraine, University of Toronto Press: Toronto, 2017; 304 pp.

External links
 Page of the city of Kharkiv on Kurbas
 Encyclopedia of Ukraine on Mykola Kulish
 Encyclopedia of Ukraine on the Berezil'
 Encyclopedia of Ukraine on  Vadym Meller
Les Kurbas Theater Lviv 

1887 births
1937 deaths
People from Sambir
People from the Kingdom of Galicia and Lodomeria
Ukrainian Austro-Hungarians
Austro-Hungarian emigrants to the Russian Empire
Ukrainian theatre directors
Ukrainian Discourse Theatre
Recipients of the title of People's Artists of Ukraine
Ukrainian people of Lithuanian descent
Great Purge victims from Ukraine
Soviet rehabilitations
Theatre people from Odesa
Ukrainian avant-garde